José Benito Silverio Monterroso Bermúdez (1788, in Montevideo – 1838) was a Roman Catholic priest from the Banda Oriental, the pre-independence name of Uruguay.

He was ordained in the Franciscan Order and later became lecturer in Philosophy and Theology at the University of Córdoba.

Uruguayan independence-era patriot

He was a notable patriot during the fight for freedom in colonial times. He was decisive in the development of Artiguism, the thought of José Gervasio Artigas.

Family background

Monterroso was the eldest of six. His sister Ana married Juan Antonio Lavalleja, leader of the Thirty-Three Orientals.

References

External links
  

1780 births
1838 deaths
People from Montevideo
Uruguayan people of Galician descent
19th-century Uruguayan Roman Catholic priests
Uruguayan politicians
Uruguayan theologians
Uruguayan Franciscans
José Gervasio Artigas